Flavius Probus ( 525) was a Roman senator living in the Ostrogothic Kingdom who served as the consul of the year 525. He is called "Junior" in some sources, probably for confusion with Olybrius, a child who served as consul in 491.

Bibliography
 
 Cameron, Alan (1984). "Junior Consuls", Zeitschrift für Papyrologie und Epigraphik, 56, p. 162.

Imperial Roman consuls
6th-century deaths
5th-century Byzantine people
6th-century Byzantine people
6th-century Roman consuls
490s births
Year of birth uncertain
Year of death unknown